Sebaceoma (also known as a "sebaceous epithelioma") is a cutaneous condition that appears as a yellow or orange papule.

See also 
 Sebaceous carcinoma
 Sebaceous adenoma
 Skin lesion

References 

Epidermal nevi, neoplasms, and cysts